Qi Zhongheng (1928 – 4 December 2004) was a lieutenant general in the People's Liberation Army of China.

Biography
Qi was born in Ding County (now Dingzhou), Hebei, in 1928.

He enlisted in the Eighth Route Army in March 1941, and joined the Chinese Communist Party (CCP) in June 1943. He graduated from the Counter-Japanese Military and Political University. After founding of the Communist State, he successively served in the Shenyang Artillery School, Second Artillery Command Academy, Second Artillery Technical Academy. In June 1983, he was promoted to become political commissar of the PLA Second Artillery Engineering University (now PLA Rocket Force University of Engineering), a position he held until April 1990. He attained the rank of lieutenant general (zhongjiang) in September 1988.

On 4 December 2004, he died from an illness in Xi'an, Shaanxi, at the age of 76.

References

1928 births
2004 deaths
People from Dingzhou
Counter-Japanese Military and Political University alumni
People's Liberation Army generals from Hebei